The Gomberg–Bachmann reaction, named for the Russian-American chemist Moses Gomberg and the American chemist Werner Emmanuel Bachmann, is an aryl-aryl coupling reaction via a diazonium salt.

The arene compound (here benzene) is reacted with a diazonium salt in the presence of a base to provide the biaryl through an intermediate aryl radical. For example, p-bromobiphenyl may be prepared from 4-bromoaniline and benzene:

 BrC6H4NH2 + C6H6 → BrC6H4−C6H5

The reaction offers a wide scope for both diazonium component and arene component but yields are generally low following the original procedure (less than 40%), given the many side-reactions of diazonium salts. Several improvements have been suggested. One possibility is to employ diazonium tetrafluoroborates in arene solvent together with a phase-transfer catalyst, another is to use 1-aryl-3,3-dialkyltriazenes.

Pschorr reaction
One intramolecular variation which gives better results is the Pschorr cyclization:

The group Z can be CH2, CH2CH2, NH and CO (to fluorenone) to name just a few.

See also
 Graebe–Ullmann synthesis
 Meerwein arylation
 Sandmeyer reaction

References

Substitution reactions
Name reactions